Kells Academy is an English-language academic high school, middle school and elementary school in Montreal, Quebec. The campuses are all located on De Maisonneuve West in Côte-des-Neiges-Notre-Dame-de-Grâce, Montréal, Québec. The school offers coed programs for kindergarten to grade 12.

Founded in 1978 by Ms. Irene Woods, the school is currently headed  by Mrs. Linda Leiberman

History 
Kells Academy was established in 1978 as the Westmount Learning Center by Ms. Irene Woods. It was founded as a practical application of tutoring in the classroom. The school began seeing larger enrollment numbers which ultimately led them to acquire its own building on De Maisonneuve West and Park Row West in CDN-NDG as of 1990. They also expanded with the acquisition of the Hydro Quebec building in 2004 that was situated on Cavendish Boulevard at the corner of De Maisonneuve, where the elementary school soon relocated.

Enrollment grew as the number of foreign students increased, notably coming from Ukraine, China, Vietnam, Syria, and Turkey.

When the property beside the elementary school became available, Kells purchased it and rebuilt it to act as a middle school campus, opening in 2017. That same year, the school rented a Westmount space to become the new language center.

Facilities 
Kells Academy has three main buildings. The highschool is located at 6865 De Maisonneuve (H4B 1T1). It is equipped with a cafeteria, library, music and art rooms, an IT/Resource center, and a science laboratory. Adjacent to the building in Trenholme Park is a gymnasium, an outdoor soccer field, a baseball diamond, and a winter skating rink that is used by the highschool. [1]

The middle school building is  located at 6645 De Maisonneuve West (H4B 2Y3) . It is equipped with a cafeteria, a music room and an art room. Adjacent to the building in Trenholme Park is a gymnasium, an outdoor soccer field, a baseball diamond, and a winter skating rink that is used by the middle school. [1]

The elementary building, located at  2290 Cavendish Boulevard (H4B 2Y3), is equipped with a library, music and art rooms, a cafeteria, a gymnasium, and an outdoor playground area which features a turf soccer field. [1]

Admission 
Kells Academy doesn’t receive subsidies from the provincial government and therefore doesn’t require the certificate of eligibility.

References

1978 establishments in Quebec
Educational institutions established in 1978
High schools in Montreal
Private schools in Quebec
Preparatory schools in Quebec